Typhoon Meranti, known in the Philippines as Super Typhoon Ferdie, was one of the most intense tropical cyclones on record. Impacting the Batanes in the Philippines, Taiwan, as well as Fujian Province in September 2016, Meranti formed as a tropical depression on September 8 near the island of Guam. Tracking to the west northwest, Meranti gradually intensified until September 11, at which point it began a period of rapid intensification. Shortly afterwards, it passed directly over the island of Itbayat. Meranti passed to the south of Taiwan as a super typhoon, and began weakening steadily as a result of land interaction. By September 15, it struck Fujian Province as a Category 2-equivalent typhoon, becoming the strongest typhoon on record to impact the province. Upon moving inland, rapid weakening ensued and Meranti became extratropical the next day, dissipating shortly afterwards after it passed to the south of the Korean Peninsula.

The island of Itbayat sustained a direct hit from the super typhoon near its peak intensity, severing communications from the island for several days. However, no fatalities were reported on the island. The typhoon caused ₱244.99 million (US$5.16 million) in damage on the island. However, the most costly and direct impacts were felt in eastern China, where 45 people were killed from floods. Total economic cost in China reached ¥31.78 billion (US$4.76 billion). In total, Meranti caused US$4.79 billion in damage and killed 47 people.

During its lifetime, Meranti broke or tied several meteorological records. Additionally, in terms of 1-minute sustained winds, the storm's landfall on the island of Itbayat shortly after peak intensity ties it with Haiyan as the second strongest landfalling tropical cyclone on record, only behind Goni.

Meteorological history

According to the agency, the circulation was rapidly consolidating alongside fragmented rainbands. At 18:00 UTC that night, the Japan Meteorological Agency (JMA) classified the system as a tropical depression. On the next day, the JTWC classified it as Tropical Depression 16W. By that time, the nascent system was moving slowly west-northwestward through a region of low wind shear, steered by ridges to the north and southwest. Increasing but fragmented convection, or thunderstorms, was fueled by unusually warm water temperatures and outflow from the south. At 06:00 UTC on September 10, the JMA upgraded the depression to Tropical Storm Meranti, which meandered over its own track while consolidating.

Northerly wind shear shifted the deepest convection to the south of Meranti's circulation, although rainbands and a central dense overcast continued to evolve as the wind shear decreased. By early on September 11, the storm's movement was steady to the west-northwest, south of the ridge. At 06:00 UTC that day, the JMA upgraded Meranti to typhoon status, and shortly thereafter the JTWC followed suit. The storm's structure continued to improve, with increased outflow. Outflow enhanced by a strong anticyclone over Meranti fueled the intensification, and the typhoon peaked in intensity on September 13 while passing through the Luzon Strait.

Based on the JMA pressure estimate, Meranti was among the most intense tropical cyclones. The JTWC wind estimate made Meranti the strongest tropical cyclone by wind speed worldwide in 2016, surpassing Cyclone Winston, which had peak sustained winds of  when it struck Fiji in February.

Impact

Philippines

Meranti struck the northernmost Philippine province of Batanes at peak strength, passing directly over the island of Itbayat; the island was left isolated after communications were lost during the storm on September 14. From text messages received by family members, residents in Itbayat reported their stone homes to be swaying during the height of the typhoon. Assessments as of September 17 indicated that 292 homes were destroyed and 932 were damaged across the Batanes. More than 10,000 people were affected by the storm, with many in dire need of water. A state of calamity was declared for the province on September 15. Total damage exceeded an approximate total of ₱244.99 million (US$5.16 million) as of September 24.

Government relief efforts reached Itbayat on September 18, reporting no casualties on the island.

Taiwan

At least two people were killed in Taiwan. Nearly 1 million households lost power and 720,000 lost water supply.  Agricultural damage exceeded NT$850 million (US$26.8 million). A small lighthouse in Taitung County collapsed and rough seas unmoored 10 vessels in Kaohsiung Harbor.

Mainland China

Typhoon Meranti wrought extensive damage across Fujian and Zhejiang provinces. In Fujian, the storm killed 18 people and left 11 others missing. Typhoon-force winds and flash floods caused tremendous damage, leaving ¥31.78 billion (US$4.76 billion) in economic losses and killed 45 people across East China. In Fujian, the cities of Xiamen, Quanzhou and Zhangzhou were left paralyzed in Meranti's wake, while flash floods in Yongchun County destroyed an 871-year-old bridge that was classified as a protected heritage site. Flooding in Zhejiang claimed at least ten lives and left four others missing. At least 902 homes collapsed and 1.5 million people in the province were affected.

Retirement

During the 49th annual session from the ESCAP/WMO Typhoon Committee during February 2017, the name Meranti was retired from the rotating lists of names. In March 2018, the Typhoon Committee chose Nyatoh as its replacement name.

See also

 Typhoon Wayne (1983) – took a similar path in July 1983 and reached Category 4 typhoon before made landfall in China
 Typhoon Soudelor (2015)
 Typhoon Nepartak (2016)
 Typhoon Haiyan
 1935 Labor Day hurricane
 Typhoon Yutu (2018)
 Typhoon Goni (2020)
 Typhoon Chanthu (2021)

Notes

References

External links

 JMA Best Track Data of Typhoon Meranti (1614) 
 16W.MERANTI from the U.S. Naval Research Laboratory

2016 Pacific typhoon season
2016 disasters in China
2016 in Taiwan
2016 disasters in the Philippines
September 2016 events in Asia
Typhoons in China
Typhoons in Taiwan
Typhoons in the Philippines
Meranti